Rafał Fedaczyński (born 3 December 1980) is a Polish race walker. He competed in the 50 km event at the World Race Walking Cup in 2004 and 2006, at the World Championships in 2005 and 2007, and at the 2008, 2012 and 2016 Olympics. His best result was eighth place at the 2008 Olympics.

He set a personal best of 3:46:05 hours for the 50 km walk at the 2011 Dudinska Patdesiatka, where he was the runner-up behind Matej Tóth.

Competitions record

References

External links

1980 births
Living people
Polish male racewalkers
Athletes (track and field) at the 2008 Summer Olympics
Athletes (track and field) at the 2012 Summer Olympics
Athletes (track and field) at the 2016 Summer Olympics
Olympic athletes of Poland
People from Hrubieszów
Sportspeople from Lublin Voivodeship